The Braga Football Association (Associação de Futebol de Braga, abrv. AF Braga) is the district governing body for the all football competitions in the Portuguese district of Braga since 1992. It is also the regulator of the clubs registered in the district.

Below the Campeonato Nacional de Seniores (Portuguese third level) the competitions are organised at a district level (known in Portuguese as Distritais) with each District Association organising its competitions according to geographical and other factors. AF Braga runs a league competition with three divisions, at the fourth, fifth and sixth levels of the Portuguese football league system, a cup competition known as Taça AF Braga, and a Supercup.

In more general terms the AF Braga currently organises District Championships for football and Futsal for men and women for all age groups including Senior, Junior, Youth, Beginners, Infants and Schools.

Notable clubs affiliated to Braga FA
 Sporting de Braga
 Vitória de Guimarães
 Gil Vicente FC
 F.C. Famalicão
 Moreirense FC
 AD Fafe
 GD Joane
 Santa Maria FC
 Vilaverdense FC
 SC Maria da Fonte
 AD Esposende
 FC Amares
 FC Marinhas
 CF Fão
 GD Serzedelo

Current Divisions - 2014–15 Season
The AF Braga runs the following divisions covering the fourth, fifth and sixth tiers of the Portuguese football league system.

Pró-Nacional

Arões Sport Clube
Associação Desportiva Águias da Graça Futebol Clube
Associação Desportiva Ninense
Associação Desportiva Recreativa e Cultural de Terras de Bouro
Brito Sport Clube
Centro de Cultura e Desporto O Desportivo de Ronfe
Clube de Caçadores das Taipas
Clube Desportivo Celoricense
Clube Desportivo de Celeirós
Futebol Clube de Amares
Futebol Clube de Marinhas
Grupo Desportivo de Joane
Grupo Desportivo de Porto D'Ave
Grupo Desportivo de Serzedelo
Grupo Desportivo União Torcatense
Merelinense Futebol Clube
S. Paio D'Arcos Futebol Clube
Sport Clube Maria da Fonte

Honra – série A

Académico Futebol Clube de Martim
Associação Desportiva de Carreira
Associação Desportiva de Esposende
Associação Recreativa e Cultural Águias de Alvelos
Centro Desportivo e Cultural de Viatodos
Dumiense Futebol Clube
Forjães Sport Clube
Futebol Clube de Tadim
Futebol Clube de Roriz
Grupo de Futebol Clube da Pousa
Grupo Desportivo de Prado
MARCA - Movimento Associativo de Recreio, Cultura e Arte
Soarense Sport Clube
Sporting Clube de Cabreiros
União Desportiva São Veríssimo
União Desportiva Vila Chã

Honra – série B

Associação Cultural e Desportiva da Pica
Centro Recreativo e Popular de Delães
Clube Desportivo de Ponte
Desportivo de Arco de Baúlhe
Desportivo de São Cosme
Emilianos Futebol Clube
Grupo Cultural e Desportivo de Regadas
Grupo Desportivo da Pedralva
Grupo Desportivo de Caldelas
Grupo Desportivo de Travassós
Grupo Desportivo do Gerês
Grupo Desportivo do Louro
Grupo Desportivo Recreativo Os Amigos de Urgeses
Operário Futebol Clube de Antime
Pevidém Sport Clube
Ruivanense Atlético Clube

1ª divisão – série A

Associação Cultural Desportiva de Parada de Tibães
Associação Desportiva de Gondifelos
Associação Desportiva Juventude de Mouquim
Bairro Futebol Clube
Clube de Futebol «Os Ceramista»
Futebol Clube Ferreirense
Granja Futebol Clube
Grupo Desportivo de Fradelos
Grupo Desportivo de Guisande
Movimento da Juventude da Póvoa
Operário Futebol Clube
Palmeiras Futebol Clube
Panoiense Futebol Clube
Sequeirense Futebol Clube
Sporting Clube da Ucha

1ª divisão – série B

Aboim da Nóbrega Atlético Clube
Arsenal Clube da Devesa
Associação Cultural e Recreativa de Guilhofrei
Clube Desportivo Recreativo Cultural Rendufe Futebol Clube
Este Futebol Clube
Futebol Clube de Sobreposta
Grupo Cultural Desportivo Recreativo de Lanhas
Grupo Desportivo Bairro da Misericórdia
Grupo Desportivo de Adaúfe
Grupo Desportivo e Cultural de Mosteiro
Grupo Desportivo dos Peões
Lomarense Ginásio Clube
São Mamede D'Este Futebol Clube
Sporting Clube Leões das Enguardas

1ª divisão – série C

Associação Cultural e Desportiva Ases de Santa Eufémia
Associação Cultural e Desportiva de São Nicolau de Basto
Associação Desportiva S. Paio Sport Clube
Atlético Cabeceirense
Clube Operário de Campelos
Futebol Clube Prazins
Grupo Desportivo de Cavez
Grupo Desportivo de Fareja
Grupo Desportivo de Longos
Grupo Desportivo de Selho
Grupo Desportivo de Silvares
Grupo Desportivo Recreativo Cultural Os Sandinenses
Mota Futebol Clube
Sport Clube Fermilense
União Desportiva de Airão

District Championships

Historic champions

Titles
 Braga - 10
 Vitória de Guimarães - 9
 Sport Clube Fafe - 1
 Desportivo de Monção -1

Men's Seniores Winners

All-time Primeira Liga table
These are the most successful Braga FA clubs in the history of Primeira Liga (as of 02/2021):

See also
 Portuguese District Football Associations
 Portuguese football competitions
 List of football clubs in Portugal

References 

Braga
Sports organizations established in 1922
1922 establishments in Portugal